Pierre Louis Rayer, who is known by his credited stage name as Pierre Vernier (born 25 May 1931) is a French actor.

Career
Pierre Vernier has repeatedly worked with Claude Chabrol, Henri Verneuil and Claude Lelouch, Georges Lautner and Jacques Deray.

In 2009 he portrayed Charles de Gaulle in a TV film.

Filmography

References

External links 
 Pierre Vernier at Uni France Films
 
 

1931 births
Living people
French male film actors
French male television actors
20th-century French male actors
21st-century French male actors
French National Academy of Dramatic Arts alumni